Lam Sonthi is a tributary of the Pa Sak River. It originates at the Ruak and Phanghoei mountains in the border area of Lam Sonthi district, Lopburi province and Si Thep, Phetchabun province. The river flows southward as the backbone of Lam Sonthi district and joins with the Lam Phaya Klang from Muak Lek district, Saraburi province. Then the watercourse flows ahead to west and tributes the Pa Sak River in Chai Badan.

References

Sonthi